New Hampshire Route 109 (abbreviated NH 109) is a  north–south highway in Carroll County, New Hampshire. It runs southeast from Sandwich to the Maine border.

The northern terminus of NH 109 is at New Hampshire Route 113 in the village of Center Sandwich in the Lakes Region. The eastern terminus is at the Maine state line in the town of Wakefield, where the road continues as Maine State Route 109, heading toward the town of Acton.

NH 109 between Wolfeboro and Moultonborough is locally known as the Governor Wentworth Highway, with signage reading "The Governor John Wentworth Highway", in reference to Sir John Wentworth, 1st Baronet (1737–1820), who served as provincial governor from 1767 to 1775.

Major intersections

Suffixed routes

The road splits off from New Hampshire Route 109, runs southeast roughly parallel to NH 109, and rejoins NH 109 again. The northern section of NH 109A is locally named Middle Road. The southern section is locally named Pine Hill Road.

The northern terminus of NH 109A is at NH 109 in Tuftonboro. The southern terminus is in Wolfeboro at New Hampshire Route 28 and NH 109.

References

External links 

 New Hampshire State Route 109 on Flickr
 New Hampshire State Route 109A on Flickr

109
Transportation in Carroll County, New Hampshire